The S-65 tractor or Stalinets S-65 was an agricultural tractor built by the Chelyabinsk Tractor Factory (Chelyabinskii Traktornyi Zavod – ChTZ) from 1937 until 1941. These tractors were used in military service as they were widely available and capable of towing heavy guns.

Description

This 11 tonne tractor features a large one cylinder diesel engine in a prominent rectangular housing. The operator’s station was either open or enclosed and was designed for up to two crew. There were two common enclosures. One, made of wood was very rectangular while the second is an adapted cabin from a ZIS truck. The engine produced 65 horsepower and it had a top speed of 7 km/h. It is estimated it had an endurance/range of about 80 km.

Development

In 1932, the Chelyabinsk tractor factory commenced operations and its first product was the S-60 tractor. The following product, the S-65, featured the M-17 diesel engine generating 49-56 kW (60-72 hp).  From 1937 until 1941, approximately 37,600 S-65s were produced.

Operational notes

The Stalinets-60 and 65 tractors were typically assigned to heavy division and corps level weapons such as the 152mm ML-20 and even the much heavier 203mm B-4 howitzer. These tractors were also commonly used by tank recovery teams to extract damaged tanks and by engineer units to tow special equipment. Unfortunately, the slow speed of these tractors (3–5 km/h when towing) meant that many were captured by the rapid moving Germans in the early part of the war.

References

Tractors of the Soviet Union
Chelyabinsk Tractor Plant products
Artillery tractors
Military vehicles introduced in the 1930s